Black Butterfly is a 2013 Indian Malayalam-language film directed by Rajaputra Ranjith. The film was produced by Maniyanpilla Raju and stars Mithun Murali, Malavika Nair, Niranj, and Samskruthy Shenoy in the lead. It is written by J Pallasserry, with M G Sreekumar as the music director, and is a remake of the Tamil film Vazhakku Enn 18/9.

Plot
The story begins with flashbacks. Benny who is interviewed by Police Inspector C.I Nandakumaran Nadar explains his life story. He started working as a cook at a roadside store in Tamil Nadu at a young age, due to debts accumulated by his family. He works at the store for eight years and was never was able to see his mother, who died due to an accident. He later attacks the owner of the store who hid the information on his mother's death and flees back to his home state of Kerala, where he starts working at a petrol station. While working at the petrol station, Benny encounters Reena, who is a maidservant at a nearby apartment buildings. Benny falls in love with Reena.

Aarathy is a student who lives in one of the apartment buildings where Reena works. Deepak is also a student who resides in the same apartment. Deepak is a spoilt brat, and the first time they meet and start interacting at Aarathy's flat, Deepak records Aarathy's under using his phone without her being aware. Aarathy falls for him without knowing his true intentions and Deepak too is attracted to Aarathy.  

Deepak seizes the opportunity and invites her to a beach resort. During this time, he shoots video clips of her private moments on the beach and also hides his phone in the bedroom of their room at the resort, where it also records her exposing her body. Then Deepak and Aarathy head back home. When she was going to propose her love to Deepak, his car breaks down on the road. As he leaves the car to get a mechanic, Aarathy unknowingly gains access to Deepak's phone and is aghast when she sees the videos. She deletes it and takes away his phone's memory card, and cuts all forms of friendship with Deepak and his love. Deepak gets frustrated when he realises that Aarathy knows about the videos and she threatens to approach the police regarding Deepak's acts.

Deepak plans to kill Aarathy in a car accident but she manages to escape. Then he plans to throw acid on her face but Reena accidentally intervenes and thus, sustains serious injuries in the process. The movie picks up speed as the corrupt Police Inspector C.I Nandakumaran Nadar begins investigations. Nandakumaran negotiates with Deepak's mother Sethulakshmi, but refuses later due to her stubborn character. He completes the investigation with Deepak as the culprit and charges him with the murder attempt. But Sethulakshmi approaches a high-ranking minister with whom Nandakumaran has close relationship and asks him to intervene. The minister and Nandakumaran negotiate, with Nandakumaran agreeing to release of Deepak from the investigation. They then try to frame Benny for the murder attempt. 

Benny is arrested, but refuses to accept that he was responsible for the murder attempt. Benny still refuses even though the police violently beat him up, in order to force him into accepting that he was responsible. Nandakumaran then blackmails Benny into standing in the shoes of the accused in front of the court, if he wants to cure Reena. Benny accepts and is sentenced for several years in prison. Later, Benny's friend Sameer reveals to Reena that Benny fell in love with her and he did not commit the crime and is falsely accused in order for her to be cured. She realises that Nandakumaran has cheated her and Benny. Angry, she gets to the court and sees Benny being taken back to the prison in a police bus. After Nandakumaran celebrates the closing of the case in a call to Sethulakshmi, he is handed a note by Reena where she vows to punish him for cheating Benny and her. Nandakumaran reacts, but Reena throws acid on him. She is immediately attacked by police officers on the scene, but was rescued by lawyers nearby who pulls her to safety.

Reena was arrested and as enquiries run course, the judiciary finds Benny innocent and releases him. Reena is sentenced to seven years in prison for the acid attack on Nandakumaran. In the final scene, Benny meets Reena in prison and proposes his love and tells her in tears that he will be waiting for her. The movie ends as he leaves the cell and with the disfigured face of Reena shown on screen.

Cast
Mithun Murali as Benny
Malavika Nair as Reena
Niranj Maniyanpilla Raju as Deepak
Samskruthy Shenoy as Aarathy
Janardhanan as Lazer
Rohini as Benny's mother
Maniyanpilla Raju as Mahadevan, Aarathy's father
Sithara as Aarathy's mother
Seema G. Nair as Mary, Reena's mother
Surabhi Lakshmi as Ramani
Nelson Shoorandu as Kanjavu Vaasu
Sukumari as old orphan lady who was cared by Reena
Ganapathi S Poduval as Sameer
Muthuraman as C.I Nandakumaran Nadar

Soundtrack

Reception 
A critic from The Times of India wrote that "A tender romance goes unfulfilled, a promise is unkept, trust is betrayed and much more happens in this seemingly simple film. It is sweetly depressing and it never forces itself upon the viewer".

References

Malayalam remakes of Tamil films
2013 films
2013 crime thriller films
Films about women in India
2010s Malayalam-language films
Indian crime thriller films